Nam Sang-nam (born 15 August 1947) is a South Korean former butterfly swimmer. She competed in two events at the 1968 Summer Olympics.

References

External links
 

1947 births
Living people
South Korean female butterfly swimmers
Olympic swimmers of South Korea
Swimmers at the 1968 Summer Olympics
People from Siheung
Sportspeople from Gyeonggi Province
20th-century South Korean women